Philipsburg Historic District may refer to:

Philipsburg Historic District (Philipsburg, Montana), listed on the National Register of Historic Places in Granite County, Montana
Philipsburg Historic District (Philipsburg, Pennsylvania), listed on the National Register of Historic Places in Centre County, Pennsylvania